Doctor Sleep may refer to:

 Doctor Sleep, a 1991 novel by Madison Smartt Bell
 Doctor Sleep (2002 film) (also known as Close Your Eyes), a British thriller film based on Bell's novel
 Doctor Sleep (novel), a 2013 horror novel by Stephen King
 Doctor Sleep (2019 film), an American horror film based on King's novel